Nesonektris aldridgei is an extinct deuterostome chordate from the Late Botomian-aged  Emu Bay Shale Lagerstätte in Kangaroo Island, Australia.  So far, it is the fourth described vetulicolian that is not restricted to the Maotianshan Shales (the other three being Ooedigera of Sirius Passet, Banffia of the Burgess Shale, and Skeemella of the Wheeler Shale).

Anatomy 
 
N. aldridgei is known from several incomplete fossils which suggest that, in life, it was a fairly large animal (when compared to other vetulicolians).  The largest fossil is about 150 millimetres long, leading researchers to estimate that that individual was about 170 millimetres long.  The exquisitely preserved fossils show that running the length inside the tail was a notochord, thereby demonstrating the animal's chordate affinities as being related to tunicates.  The forebody, and overall form are similar to vetulicolids of Vetulicolidae, though, its researchers do not have confidence to place N. aldridgei within either Vetulicolid families Vetulicolidae, or Didazoonidae.

Etymology 
The genus name translates as "island swimmer" in reference to both its obvious adaptations for a nektonic lifestyle in the water column, and the great distance between Kangaroo Island and China, the primary center of vetulicolian diversity, even during Cambrian times.  The specific name commemorates the efforts and memory of Richard "Dick" Aldridge for his crucial research in resolving vetulicolian affinities.

References 

Vetulicolia
Paleozoic animals of Australia
Fossils of Australia
Paleontology in South Australia
Fossil taxa described in 2014